The Krông Năng River is a river of Vietnam. It flows through Đắk Lắk Province for 130 kilometres.

References

Rivers of Đắk Lắk province
Rivers of Vietnam